Spiritualizing the Senses is an album by jazz pianist Horace Silver, his second released on the Silverto label, featuring performances by Silver with Eddie Harris, Bobby Shew, Ralph Moore, Bob Maize, and Carl Burnett.

Reception
The Allmusic review by Ron Wynn awarded the album 2½ stars and simply states: "Nice, characteristic hard bop on his own label".

Track listing
All compositions and lyrics by Horace Silver
 "Smelling Our Attitude"
 "Seeing with Perception"
 "The Sensitive Touch"
 "Exercising Taste and Good Judgement"
 "Hearing and Understanding"
 "Moving Forward with Confidence"
Recorded in New York City on January 19, 1983.

Personnel
Horace Silver - piano
Eddie Harris - tenor saxophone
Bobby Shew - trumpet
Ralph Moore - tenor saxophone
Bob Maize - bass
Carl Burnette - drums

References

Horace Silver albums
Silverto Records albums
1983 albums